Ola Oni (1933–1999) was a Nigerian marxist political economist, socialist and human right activist.

Early life
The anti-military and pro-democracy, Ola Oni hails from Ekiti State southwestern Nigeria where he was born but based in Ibadan, the capital of Oyo State, Nigeria.
He was a lecturer at the University of Ibadan but was sacked due to his radicalism.
Ebenezer Babatope's book, "Student Power in Nigeria" (1956-198), tells the life of Ola Oni.
He died on December 22, 1999 at the University College Hospital, Ibadan.
After his demise, he was immortalized and a social research center, Comrade Ola Oni Centre For Social Research was named after him.

Personal life
He was married to Kehinde Ola Oni, a retired civil servant  who is now blind.

See also
Omafume Onoge
Ayo Fasanmi

References

1933 births
People from Ekiti State
1999 deaths
Nigerian activists
Academic staff of the University of Ibadan
Nigerian economists
20th-century Nigerian people
Nigerian democracy activists
Nigerian human rights activists